Lithium batteries are primary batteries that use lithium as an anode. This type of battery is also referred to as a lithium-ion battery and is most commonly used for electric vehicles and electronics. The first type of lithium battery was created by the British chemist M. Stanley Whittingham in the early 1970s and used titanium and lithium as the electrodes. Unfortunately, applications for this battery were limited by the high prices of titanium and the unpleasant scent that the reaction produced. Today's lithium ion battery, modeled after the Whittingham attempt by Akira Yoshino, was first developed in 1985.

Environmental impact

The physical mining of lithium and the production of lithium-ion are both labor-intensive processes. Additionally, most batteries are not properly recycled.

Extraction 
The extraction process of lithium is very resource demanding and specifically uses a lot of water in the extraction process. It is estimated that 500,000 gallons of water is used to mine one metric ton of lithium. With the world's leading country in production of lithium being Chile, the lithium mines are in rural areas with an extremely diverse ecosystem. In Chile’s Salar de Atacama, one of the driest places on earth, about 65% of the water is used to mine lithium; leaving many of the local farmers and members of the community to find water elsewhere. Along with physical implications on the environment, working conditions can violate the standards of sustainable development goals. Additionally, it is common for locals to be in conflict with the surrounding lithium mines. There have been many accounts of dead animals and ruined farms in the surrounding areas of many of these mines. In Tagong, a small town in Garzê Tibetan Autonomous Prefecture China, there are records of dead fish and large animals floating down some of the rivers near the Tibetan mines. After further investigation, researchers found that this may have been caused by leakage of evaporation pools that sit for months and sometimes even years.

Disposal 
Lithium-ion batteries contain metals such as cobalt, nickel, and manganese, which are toxic and can contaminate water supplies and ecosystems if they leach out of landfills. Additionally, fires in landfills or battery-recycling facilities have been attributed to inappropriate disposal of lithium-ion batteries. As a result, some jurisdictions require lithium-ion batteries to be recycled. In spite of the environmental cost of improper disposal of lithium-ion batteries, the rate of recycling is still relatively low, as recycling processes remain costly and immature.

Finite resource 
While lithium ion batteries can be used as a part of sustainable solution, shifting all fossil fuel-powered devices to lithium based batteries might not be the Earth's best option. There is no scarcity yet, but it is a natural resource that can be depleted. According to researchers at Volkswagen, there are about 14 million tons of lithium left, which corresponds to 165 times the production volume in 2018.

Recycling 
The EPA has guidelines regarding recycling lithium batteries in the U.S.  There are different processes for single-use or rechargeable batteries, so it is advised that batteries of all sizes are brought to special recycling centers. This will allow a safer process of breaking down the individual metals that can be reclaimed for further use.

There are currently three major methods used for the recycling of lithium-ion batteries, those being:

Pyrometallurgical recovery 
The processes within the pyrometallurgical recovery include pyrolysis, incineration, roasting, and smelting. Right now, most traditional industrial processes are not able to recover lithium. They main process is to extract other metals including cobalt, nickel, and copper. There is a very low recycling efficiency in materials and use of capital resources.  There are high energy requirements along with gas treatment mechanisms that will produce a lower volume of gas byproducts.

Hydrometallurgical metals reclamation 
Hydrometallurgy is the application of aqueous solution to recover metal from ores. It is commonly used for copper recovery. This method has been used for other metals to help eliminate the problem of sulfur dioxide byproducts that more conventional smelting causes.

Direct recycling 
While recycling is an option, it still generally remains being more expensive than mining the ores themselves. With the rising demand for lithium-ion batteries the need for a more efficient recycling program is detrimental with many companies racing to find the most efficient method. One of the most pressing issues is when the batteries are manufactured, recycling is not considered a design priority.

Application 
There are many uses for lithium-ion batteries since they are light, rechargeable and are compact. They mostly used in electric vehicles and hand held electronics, but they are also increasingly used in military and aerospace applications.

Electric vehicles 
The primary industry and source of the lithium-ion battery is electric vehicles (EV). Electric vehicles have seen a massive increase in sales in recent years with over 90% of all global car markets having EV incentives in place as of 2019. With this increase in sales of EVs and the continued sales of them we can see a significant improvement to environmental impacts from the reduction of fossil fuel dependencies. There has been recent studies that explore different uses for recycled lithium ion batteries specifically from electric vehicles. Specifically the secondary use of lithium ion batteries recycled from electric vehicles for secondary use in power load peak shaving in China has been proven to be effective for grid companies. With the environmental threats that are posed by spent lithium-ion batteries paired with the future supply risks of battery components for electric vehicles, remanufacturing of lithium batteries must be considered. Based on the EverBatt model, a test was conducted in China which concluded that remanufacturing of lithium-ion batteries will only be cost effective when the purchase price of spent batteries remains low. Recycling will also have significant benefits to environmental impacts. In terms of greenhouse gas reduction we see a 6.62% reduction in total GHG emissions with the use of remanufacturing.

See also 

 Aluminum-ion battery
 Battery recycling
 Glass battery
 Lithium battery 
 Lithium-sulfur battery
 Sodium-ion battery 
 Potassium-ion battery
 Environmental impact of Electric Cars  
 Pyrometallurgical  
 Hydrometallurgy

References 

Lithium-ion batteries